The Gulf of Tribugá is a gulf on the Pacific coast of Colombia. It contains exuberant mangroves.
The bay is a spawning ground for humpback whales.
Tourist attractions include diving and watching whales and turtles.
There are plans to build a major deep-water port at the village of Tribugá in the main river estuary.

Location

The Gulf of Tribugá is on the Pacific Coast of Colombia in the Chocó Department.
It may be reached by sea from the port of Buenaventura or by air to the municipality of Nuquí.
The Utría National Natural Park is to the north of the gulf.
Cabo Corrientes is at the southern end.
The municipality of Nuquí, with a population of 7,000, is in the center of the gulf and has an airport, hospital, high school and commercial infrastructure.
There is an indigenous community of Emberá people in the basins of the Valle, Nuquí, Jurubidá, Panguí rivers.

Environment

There is high rainfall, with least rain in January and February.
The Esmeraldes-Pacific Colombia mangroves are found along the coasts of Colombia and Ecuador from the Gulf of Tribugá in the north to Mompiche Bay in the south.
Core samples have shown that in the south of the gulf dominant populations of Rhizophora mangroves have been relatively stable for the last 4,500 years. 
In recent years abundant Acrostichum aureum have appeared, probably introduced by humans. 
In one area of the northern gulf there have been populations of Pelliciera rhizophorae for about 2,600 years, but in another area the mangroves are from recent colonization.

Land animals include bats, marsupials, anteaters, sloths, jaguars, pumas, otters, coatis, bush dogs, snakes, poison frogs and iguanas.
There are 270 species of birds including harpy eagles and herons.

Tourist attractions

The gulf has pristine beaches and exuberant mangroves.
It is suitable for diving, best in March through August. 
There is a rocky sea bed, small corals, large schools of fish, and great diversity and color.
Humpback whales use Utría Cove to give birth from August to October.
From August to November loggerhead sea turtle and hawksbill sea turtle spawn on the San Pichí, Blanca and Guachalito beaches.

Planned port

There have been discussions over building a major port in the gulf, the Puerto de Tribugá.
The deep water port would provide improved transport to Asia, bypassing the Panama canal.
The route from Medellín to Tribugá via Quibdó is much shorter than the route to Buenaventura in the south.
There are no sediment problems and space for docks and long-term port developments.

In July 2014 it was reported that there was an informal commitment by the ICCO Group to start construction in 2016, if the project were approved.
ICCO Group had said they were interested in participating in market and environmental impact studies. 
If there were no delays, the studies would be completed by December 2015, followed by granting of the environmental license and then construction.
An access railway from Quibdó to Nuquí and Tribugá would also require environmental studies, but these should proceed faster, so the railway could be built in time for transport of materials to the port during construction. The Ministry of Transport had already endorsed the  railroad project.

The documentary film Expedicion Tribugá was released in November 2020, featuring scientists researching the local biodiversity and the inhabitants of the gulf explaining their concerns over the building of the port. As part of the Expedicion Tribuga project, the gulf was declared a biodiversity "Hope Spot" by Mission Blue, an organization led by ocean scientist Dr. Sylvia Earle.

Notes

Sources

Geography of Chocó Department
Bays of Colombia